Jesper Pettersson (born July 16, 1994) is a Swedish professional ice hockey defenceman currently playing with Linköping HC of the Swedish Hockey League (SHL).

Playing career
He made his Elitserien debut playing with Linköpings HC during the 2012–13 Elitserien season. Pettersson was selected by the Philadelphia Flyers in the 7th round, 198th overall, at the 2014 National Hockey League (NHL) Entry Draft.

On July 14, 2014, Pettersson signed a three-year entry-level contract worth $1.725 million with the Philadelphia Flyers.

After three seasons within the Flyers organization, and with limited prospects of playing in the NHL, Pettersson opted to return to his homeland as an impending restricted free agent, agreeing to a two-year deal with Djurgårdens IF on May 2, 2017.

Career statistics

Regular season and playoffs

International

References

External links
 

1994 births
Living people
Swedish ice hockey defencemen
Djurgårdens IF Hockey players
Lehigh Valley Phantoms players
Linköping HC players
Philadelphia Flyers draft picks
Reading Royals players
Ice hockey people from Stockholm